Marianne Debouzy, born Marianne Bella Lehmann (5 December 1929 – 20 June 2021) was a French historian who specialized in American history.

Biography
Debouzy was born into a Jewish family in Paris in 1929. After World War II, the family decided to change their surname to Lalande in order to avoid anti-Semitism. Marianne earned a degree in English from the Sorbonne in 1949 and subsequently studied in the United States for two years. She then worked as a research assistant at the University of Lille from 1956 to 1969, specializing in American studies. In 1969, she defended her doctoral thesis. That same year, she became one of the first professors in the history department at the University of Paris VIII, where she taught American social history until 1998. In 1971, she first contributed to the journal Le Mouvement social.

Debouzy was inspired by the working-class cultural revival in the United States in the 1960s. She closely followed the history of the American working class, taking up subjects sparsely studied in France since researchers Pierre Émile Levasseur and Louis Vigouroux. Her work particularly related to uprisings and strikes in 1877, which questioned "the image of a revolutionary French working class since 1789 and of an American working class, docile and always having made a pact with capitalism". She also followed the relationship between America's ruling class and its working class. On this topic, she wrote various articles in the Encyclopædia Universalis.

Marianne Debouzy died in the 5th arrondissement of Paris on 20 June 2021 at the age of 91.

Works
Travail et travailleurs aux États-Unis (1984)
A l'ombre de la statue de la liberté : immigrants et ouvriers dans la République américaine 1880-1920 (1988)
La Classe ouvrière dans l'histoire américaine (1989)
Le Capitalisme « sauvage » aux États-Unis, 1860-1900 (1991)
Le monde du travail aux États-Unis : Les temps difficiles (1980-2005) (2009)
Désobéissance civile aux États-Unis et en France (2016)

References

1929 births
2021 deaths
20th-century French Jews
Historians of the United States
20th-century French historians
University of Paris alumni
Academic staff of the University of Lille Nord de France
Academic staff of Paris 8 University Vincennes-Saint-Denis
Writers from Paris
French expatriates in the United States